Electro-Vox Recording Studios (or simply Vox) is a recording studio in Hollywood, Los Angeles, California, United States, currently owned by American musician Woody Jackson. It is located on Melrose Avenue across from the Paramount Pictures gate.

History
Electro-Vox Recording Studios was first founded and opened 1931, and is considered one of the oldest independent recording studios in the world. Electro-Vox was originally operated by Bert Gottschalk, founder and President at that time. Fast forward to the mid 1950s, his son, Alan Gottschalk, followed in his fathers' footsteps and helped run the business until his own semi-retirement in 2000. Among the many notable achievements, Bert first built the studio's record/disc-cutting machines in 1936.  In addition, in the 1930s, Bert was considered a vital part of the introduction of the term known as "Aircheck" technology.  The subsequent usage had significant and positive impacts on the world of "Radio" at the time.  Bert, who handed the reins of Electro-Vox to his son Alan in the early 1960s, died in 1967. 

From 1931 to 1950 (and even beyond), Electro-Vox recorded all of the "airchecks" from the NBC/Mutual-Don Lee Radio/TV KHJ-TV radio station at 5515 Melrose Avenue (virtually across the street), including performances by Bing Crosby, Bob Hope, Jack Benny, George Burns and Gracie Allen. Electro-Vox also recorded many of the original demos for Paramount Studios artists, which was located directly across the street from the Electro-Vox Recording Studio location. 

Between 1950 and 1956, Capitol Records occupied the studios on Melrose before moving to the Capitol Tower location on Vine Street. Many Capitol Records artists used Electro-Vox as a rehearsal space and a studio to record their demos, including (but certainly not limited too), the King Cole Trio, Henry Mancini, Jerry Lewis, Herb Alpert, Frank Sinatra, Cole Porter, Harold Arlen, Dinah Shore, Eddie Cantor, Judy Garland, Sammy Fain, Spade Cooley, the Sons of the Pioneers, Plas Johnson, Burt Bacharach, and Johnny Mercer. Demos recorded at Electro-Vox included "Moon River", "Mona Lisa", "Love Is a Many-Splendored Thing", "Silver Bells", and "Buttons and Bows". It is certainly worth mentioning that Tex Ritter, a pioneer of American country music, from the mid-1930s into the 1960s, recorded and broadcast many live radio shows at Electro-Vox during the same time period. 

For over four decades, the majority of the LA Times radio spots, were produced and written by very talented personnel in the LA Times media/marketing department. These radio spots helped to market, sell and promote the LA Times daily newspaper publishing's, and were taped and recorded live, from the LA Times building in downtown LA (in an old bank vault btw), over the phone, to the Electro-Vox Recording Studio location in Hollywood.  Alan Gottschalk oversaw the majority of these radio spots/on-air productions, that at the time, were recorded and taped on an average of three times each week. Gordon Phillips (known as the "Voice of the LA Times"), was the Director of Promotion and Public Relations, and had a long standing, quality, working relationship with Electro-Vox.  This relationship between Electro-Vox and the LA Times, lasted for some 25 years, until Gordon's own untimely passing in 1984.

In addition to the top-notch recording services still being offered and used, during the 1980s and 1990s, multiple Hollywood movie production studios filmed various scenes at Electro-Vox, known for its realistic interior and exterior appearance, as an authentic "period" recording studio from the decades of the 1930s through the 1970s, which is also considered by many as "an era gone by".   "Bird", "Grace of My Heart" and "For The Boys" were just a few of many well-publicized motion pictures during the time period of the 1980s and 1990s, that had important scenes to their respective movies filmed at Electro-Vox.  During this same time frame, Electro-Vox was also used for "period" scenes on several made for TV, movies of the week and Music videos. 

The historical logo was originally created, licensed and used by Bert Gottschalk in the 1930s, and was featured quite predominantly, up until Alan Gottschalk's semi-official retirement in 2000, at the physical site of the Electro-Vox location in Hollywood. The original (and official) Electro-Vox Logo, copyright and branding continued to be used up until Alan's unfortunate passing in January of 2018. Alan's son, David Gottschalk currently oversees and monitors the aforementioned.   

Stan Ross worked at Electro-Vox in the early 1950s, but left to create Gold Star Studios, which was modeled after Electro-Vox. 

When Alan Gottschalk semi-retired in 2000, the studio was then owned by Joey Altruda for nine years. In 2009, Woody Jackson took control of Electro-Vox.

Albums recorded at Vox
Adapted from 

 If By Yes – Salt on Sea Glass (2011)
 Cashier No.9 – To the Death of Fun (2011)
 M83 – Hurry Up, We're Dreaming (2011)
 Dan Stuart – The Deliverance of Marlowe Billings (2012)
 Petra Haden – Petra Goes to the Movies (2012)
 Sean Rowe – The Salesman and the Shark (2012)
 Aaron Embry – Tiny Prayers (2012)
 Tenacious D – Jazz (2012)
 Sacri Cuori – Rosario (2012)
 Health – Max Payne 3 Official Soundtrack (2012)
 Norah Jones – Little Broken Hearts (2012)
 T Bone Burnett – Nashville (2012)
 The Black Keys – Tour Rehearsal Tapes (2012)
 Beck – Song Reader (2012)
 Woody Jackson – Dos Manos (2012)
 Mumiy Troll – SOS Matrosu (2013)
 Priscilla Ahn – This Is Where We Are (2013)
 Foy Vance – Joy of Nothing (2013)
 Portugal. the Man – Evil Friends (2013)
 Primal Scream – More Light (2013)
 Haim – Days Are Gone (2013)
 Arctic Monkeys – AM (2013)
 Vampire Weekend – Modern Vampires of the City (2013)
 Sky Ferreira – Night Time, My Time (2013)
 Carly Ritter – Carly Ritter (2013)
 The Growl – What Would Christ Do?? (2013)
 Hamilton Leithauser – Black Hours (2014)
 Charli XCX – Sucker (2014)
 The Living Sisters – Harmony Is Real (2014)
 Kimbra – The Golden Echo (2014)
 Jane Weaver – The Silver Globe (2014)
 Rae Morris – Unguarded (2015)
 Mini Mansions – The Great Pretenders (2015)
 Suzanne Vega – Tales from the Realm of the Queen of Pentacles (2014)
 Brandon Flowers – The Desired Effect (2015)
 Nate Ruess – Grand Romantic (2015)
 Blue Jean Committee – Gentle and Soft (2015)
 Unloved – Guilty of Love (2015)
 Wavves – V (2015)
 CeeLo Green – Heart Blanche (2015)
 Joanna Newsom – Divers (2015)
 Tobias Jesso Jr. – Goon (2015)
 Adele – 25 (2015)
 De La Soul – And the Anonymous Nobody... (2016)
 Young the Giant – Home of the Strange (2016)
 Local Natives – Sunlit Youth (2016)
 Angel Olsen – My Woman (2016)
 Autolux – Pussy's Dead (2016)
 Doyle Bramhall II – Rich Man (2016)
 Lady Gaga – Joanne (2016)
 Empire of the Sun – Two Vines (2016)
 Hamilton Leithauser & Rostam – I Had a Dream That You Were Mine (2016)
 Kelly Clarkson – Meaning of Life (2017)
 Kamasi Washington – Harmony of Difference (2017)
 The War on Drugs – A Deeper Understanding (2017)
 Foxygen – Hang (2017)
 Grizzly Bear – Painted Ruins (2017)
 Sweet Pea Atkinson – Get What You Deserve (2017)
 Haim – Something to Tell You (2017)
 Angel Olsen – Phases (2017)
 Rostam – Half-Light (2017)
 Alexandra Savior – Belladonna of Sadness (2017)
 Jaws of Love – Tasha Sits Close to the Piano (2017)
 Various Artists – Music from The American Epic Sessions: Original Motion Picture Soundtrack (2017)
 Paloma Faith – The Architect (2017)
 Moses Sumney – Aromanticism (2017)
 Beach Fossils – Somersault (2017)
 Elton John & Jack White – 2 Fingers of Whiskey (2017)
 Lo Moon – Lo Moon (2018)
 Arctic Monkeys – Tranquility Base Hotel & Casino (2018)
 Florence and the Machine – High as Hope (2018)
 Fall Out Boy – Mania (2018)
 Kamasi Washington – Heaven and Earth (2018)
 Doyle Bramhall II – Shades (2018)
 Vampire Weekend – Father of the Bride (2019)
 Nick Waterhouse – Nick Waterhouse (2019)
 Hozier – Wasteland, Baby! (2019)
 Various Artists – The Music of Red Dead Redemption 2 (Original Score)
 Brittany Howard – Jaime (2019)
 Devon Gilfillian – Black Hole Rainbow (2020)
 The Haden Triplets – The Family Songbook (2020)
 Haim – Women in Music Pt. III (2020)
 Bright Eyes – Down in the Weeds, Where the World Once Was (2020)
 The Killers – Imploding the Mirage (2020)
 Fleet Foxes – Shore (2020)
 Tim Heidecker – Fear of Death (2020)
 Crumb – Ice Melt (2021)
 The War on Drugs – I Don't Live Here Anymore (2021)

Electro-Vox was used many times by The Wrecking Crew, including drummer Earl Palmer.

See also
 :Category:Albums recorded at Electro-Vox Recording Studios

References

External links
 

Recording studios in California
1931 establishments in California
Music of Los Angeles
Buildings and structures in Hollywood, Los Angeles